Chekanov is a Russian masculine surname, its feminine counterpart is Chekanova. Notable people with the surname include:

Anatoli Chekanov (born 1960), Russian football player
Mikhail Chekanov (born 1961), Russian ice hockey coach

Russian-language surnames